Loranta may refer to:

 Loranta, a village in Brusturi Commune, Bihor County, Romania
 Losartan, a drug used mainly to treat high blood pressure (hypertension)